Music of Grace: Amazing Grace is a 2009 compilation album from Valley Entertainment consisting of fourteen versions of the hymn Amazing Grace.

Track listing

External links 
 [ Music of Grace: Amazing Grace on allmusic.com]
 Music of Grace: Amazing Grace on valley-entertainment.com

References

2009 compilation albums